is a paralympic athlete from Japan competing mainly in category F20 high jump events.

Kazumi competed in the F20 high jump at the 2000 Summer Paralympics winning the silver medal.

References

Paralympic athletes of Japan
Athletes (track and field) at the 2000 Summer Paralympics
Paralympic silver medalists for Japan
Living people
Medalists at the 2000 Summer Paralympics
Year of birth missing (living people)
Paralympic medalists in athletics (track and field)
Japanese female high jumpers